Didessa National Park is a national park in Ethiopia. It is located in the valley of the Didessa River, in Kamashi Zone of Benishangul-Gumuz Region in western Ethiopia.

It covers an area of 1300 km2. 

It was designated a national park in 2017 by the Government of Ethiopia. It had previously been designated a wildlife sanctuary.

References

National parks of Ethiopia
Benishangul-Gumuz Region
2017 establishments in Ethiopia